Jürgen Berginz (born in Mauren on 30 June 1989) is a Liechtensteiner bobsledder. He competed for Liechtenstein at the 2010 Winter Olympics in the four-man event.

References

External links
 

Liechtenstein male bobsledders
1989 births
Living people
Olympic bobsledders of Liechtenstein
Bobsledders at the 2010 Winter Olympics
21st-century Liechtenstein people